Ginoogaming First Nation (formerly the Long Lake 77 First Nation) is a small Anishinaabe (Ojibway) First Nation reserve located in Northern Ontario, located approximately 40 km east of Geraldton, Ontario, Canada, on the northern shore of Long Lake, immediately south of Long Lake 58 First Nation and the community of Longlac, Ontario.  As of September, 2006, their total registered population was 773 people, of which their on-Reserve population was 168.

Government

Governance

The leadership of the First Nation is determined through the Act Electoral System.  The current Chief is Celia Echum, who is serving along with six councillors: Blaine Martin, Gwen O'Nabigon, Maurice Waboose, Jerry Echum and David Charles Jr, and Joseph Dore Jr.  Their two-year elected terms began in August 2009.

The First Nation is a member of Matawa First Nations, a Regional Chiefs Council, which in turn is a member of the Nishnawbe Aski Nation, a Tribal Political Organization representing many of the First Nations in northern Ontario.

Services

Government services are provided by the First Nation, the Matawa First Nations and by the Nishnawbe Aski Nation.  Services include:
 Dilico Child & Family Services Health Program

References

External links 

 AANDC profile
 FirstNation.ca profile

First Nations governments in Ontario
Communities in Thunder Bay District
Nishnawbe Aski Nation
Anishinaabe reserves in Ontario